Big Man from the North is an American animated short film. It is a Looney Tunes cartoon, featuring Bosko, the first star of the series. It was released in January 1931, although some sources give an unspecified date in 1930. It was, like most Looney Tunes of the time, directed by Hugh Harman and Rudolf Ising; Frank Marsales was the musical director.

Summary
The iris opens to Mounted Police headquarters in a snowstorm. Within, we find the Sergeant, a pipe in his mouth, pacing the floor and occasionally spitting tobacco at a coal stove. He hears a knock at the door and opens it for Bosko, the hero of the picture.

Blown in by the wind, Bosko latches on to the sergeant's trousers; so intense is the wind that the sergeant cannot seem to close the door, and Bosko is so buffeted by the gust that the sergeant's pants follow him to the wall. Once the door is closed, the sergeant angrily confronts his inferior, who, embarrassed, hands the trousers back. But on to business! The sergeant shows Bosko a wanted poster bearing the legend "$5000 reward" and "Dead or Alive." "That's your man," growls the sergeant.

Out into the cold and wind goes Bosko alone. Three dogs on a sled await their master, two of proper size, one tiny. Bosko boards his chariot and yells "Mush!". The three dogs thunder across the snowy hills, their legs sometimes extending to accommodate the valleys rather than their bodies simply descending and ascending with the steep slopes. The party crashes into the side of a saloon; the dogs are so tangled as to have become as one, and a disoriented Bosko sits uselessly on the cold ground for a few moments as they collect their bearings. We come with Bosko to the front entrance of the saloon and see again the poster shown to Our Hero by the sergeant.

A nervous Bosko spit-shines his badge, readies two revolvers and enters the bar. Within, Honey dances and scats to the delight of the patrons. Relaxing a moment, Bosko stows his small arms in his pants in order to revel with the customers; upon the table, he dances alongside Honey and scats in such a way that he sounds a bit like a trumpet. He then shows off on the piano, bouncing merrily on a compliant stool as beavers percussively accompany his playing by slapping their tails on the counter.

The wanted villain enters, peg-legged, guns blazing! He makes his way to the bar as a terrified Bosko again shines his badge and screws up his courage in anticipation of a fight. Leveling his pistol, he takes aim at the unimpressed ruffian and fires, only to find that, in lieu of bullets, his gun contained only a tethered cork. But the incensed villain takes out his weapon and, just as he is about to fire upon poor Bosko, the clever little fellow spots and spits on a hanging gas lamp, thereby bringing darkness upon the saloon.

There is gunfire in the dark, and the light comes back on to reveal the villain still standing, panting, amidst a multitude of smoke, empty seats, and battered tables. The patrons all seem to have left; the villain turns his back and Bosko pops out from under the floorboards mounting a machine gun, which he fires square upon the bad guy's rump. Undaunted, the angry adversary brandishes a saber and chases Bosko to the double doors: these Our Hero swings just so that, himself leaping from the entryway, the fast-pursuing villain's head becomes stuck in the doors.

His foe momentarily incapacitated, Bosko captures the sword and sticks it into the villain's rear end. Enraged afresh and newly energized by this latest affront, the villain chases Bosko again, this time to the other end of the bar, where Bosko removes a shotgun from its wall mount: aiming, he fires at the antagonist who, because of the blast, is reduced to a scared, scrawny fellow surrounded by his bandoliers and a ring of his erstwhile fur. Quite finished, he runs off, out of the bar and into the distance. The patrons return to the scene of the action to cheer for their rescuer, who takes a few bows as the iris closes.

References

External links
 Big Man from the North on YouTube (unrestored)

1931 films
1931 animated films
1931 comedy films
Looney Tunes shorts
Warner Bros. Cartoons animated short films
Films directed by Hugh Harman
American black-and-white films
Bosko films
Films set in North America
1930s police comedy films
Films scored by Frank Marsales
Films directed by Rudolf Ising
1930s Warner Bros. animated short films
1930s English-language films